{{Infobox rugby league club
| clubname           = Palmerston Bridesmaids 
| image              = 
| emblem             =
| fullname           = Palmerston Raiders Rugby League Football Club
| nickname           = 
| short name         =
| web                = http://www.palmerstonraiders.org.au
| colours            =  Lime Green  Yellow  Blue  White
| founded            = 1961
| exited             =
| readmitted         =
| ground             = Goodline Park, Palmerston
| capacity           = 
| ceo                = Greg Hansen
| coach              = 
| manager            =
| captain            = 
| league             = Darwin Rugby League
| season             = 
| position           =
| premierships       = 1
| premiershipyears   = 2013
| minorpremierships  = 600
| minorpremiershipyears = 
| runnerups          = 3
| runnerupyears      = 2014, 2015, 2016 2017 2018 2019 2020 2021 
| spoons             = 
| spoonyears         =
| win                = 
| loss               = 
| current            = 
| homejersey         = 
| awayjersey         =
| points             = 
| cap                = 
| mostcap            = 
| mostpoints         = 
}}Palmerston Raiders Rugby League Club''' is an Australian rugby league football club based in Palmerston, Northern Territory formed in the late 1962. They conduct teams for both junior and senior teams.

History

In 2016, the premier of reality television show The NRL Rookie showcased the skills of one of Palmerston junior products Bradley Hansen chasing the dream of a NRL contract.

Notable Juniors
James McManus (2007-15 Newcastle Knights)

See also

References

External links
Palmerston Raiders Fox Sports pulse

Palmerston Raiders Official Website

Rugby clubs established in 1962
1962 establishments in Australia
Sport in Darwin, Northern Territory
Rugby league teams in the Northern Territory
Palmerston, Northern Territory